Thomas Dietmar Pöck (born 2 December 1981) is an Austrian former professional ice hockey defenceman. He played in the National Hockey League with the New York Rangers and the New York Islanders.

Playing career
As a youth, Pöck played in the 1994 Quebec International Pee-Wee Hockey Tournament with a team from Austria.

Pöck was a star forward turned defenceman for the University of Massachusetts Amherst Minutemen, an NCAA Division I Hockey East team. Pöck was never drafted in the NHL, but signed his first pro contract upon completing his senior year on 23 March 2004 with the New York Rangers. He immediately made his NHL debut at the end of the 2003–04 season.

Pöck played eight games for the New York Rangers in the 2005–06 season, scoring one goal, getting one assist, and accumulating four penalty minutes. He spent the majority of the season however with Rangers affiliate, the Hartford Wolf Pack of the American Hockey League, accumulating an impressive 61 points in 65 games, to finish second in the league amongst defenseman and earn a selection to the AHL Second All-Star Team. During the following 2006–07 season, Pöck played in 44 games for the Rangers, scored four goals, collected four assists, and was assessed 16 penalty minutes. He also played in four first-round playoff games, amassing three assists.

After only playing in one game with the Rangers to start the 2007–08 season, Pöck was sent down passing waivers, to play with the AHL's Wolf Pack due to the Rangers having seven other healthy defencemen on the roster. 
  
On 29 September 2008, Pöck was claimed on waivers by the Rangers' arch rivals, the New York Islanders. Pöck joined the Islanders for training camp and played a career high 59 games with the Islanders in the 2008–09 season. 
 
On 28 May 2009, with lack of NHL interest, Pöck signed with Swiss team Rapperswil-Jona Lakers of the Swiss National League A (NLA) on a two-year contract. In his two seasons with the Lakers, despite missing the playoffs in each year, Pöck led the team amongst defenseman in points.

Upon his contract expiring with the Lakers, Pöck signed a one-year contract as a free agent, with Modo Hockey of the Swedish Elitserien on 28 April 2011. In helping Modo return to playoffs in the 2011–12 season, Pöck was the clear offensive threat among the blueline, scoring 25 points in 55 games.

With the intention of returning for another opportunity in the NHL, Pöck signed a one-year two-way contract with the Colorado Avalanche on 2 July 2012. Due to the 2012 NHL lockout and the absence of NHL training camps, Pöck was directly reassigned by the Avalanche to AHL affiliate, the Lake Erie Monsters. In adding a veteran puck-moving presence to the Monsters blueline during the 2012–13 season, Pöck led the defense with 11 goals and finished second with 33 points in 62 games.

Unable to add to his NHL experience, Pöck signed a two-year contract to return to his native Austria with original club, EC KAC, of the EBEL on 10 April 2013. After three seasons in Klagenfurt, he was not tendered a new contract. On 3 October 2016, he belatedly signed a contract with the Graz 99ers to remain in the EBEL. In the 2016–17 season, Pöck continued his scoring contributions to the blueline, in adding 6 goals and 30 points in 46 games. However, after a short playoff-run his contract with the 99ers was not renewed resulting in his release as a free agent.

Pöck retired at the end of 2017 and was named head coach of the Boston Pride in the National Women's Hockey League. He left the Pride after one season. He was later named coach for the Northern Cyclones of the USPHL Elite.

Career statistics

Regular season and playoffs

International

Awards and honours

References

External links

1981 births
Living people
Austrian ice hockey defencemen
Charlotte Checkers (1993–2010) players
Graz 99ers players
Hartford Wolf Pack players
Ice hockey players at the 2002 Winter Olympics
Ice hockey players at the 2014 Winter Olympics
EC KAC players
Lake Erie Monsters players
Modo Hockey players
New York Islanders players
New York Rangers players
Olympic ice hockey players of Austria
Sportspeople from Klagenfurt
SC Rapperswil-Jona Lakers players
Undrafted National Hockey League players
University of Massachusetts Amherst alumni
UMass Minutemen ice hockey players
AHCA Division I men's ice hockey All-Americans
Austrian expatriate ice hockey people
Expatriate ice hockey players in the United States
Austrian expatriate sportspeople in Sweden
Austrian expatriate sportspeople in Switzerland
Austrian expatriate sportspeople in the United States
Expatriate ice hockey players in Switzerland
Expatriate ice hockey players in Sweden